Encomium Emmae Reginae or Gesta Cnutonis Regis is an 11th-century Latin encomium in honour of the English queen Emma of Normandy. It was written in 1041 or 1042, probably by a monk of Saint-Omer, Normandy.

Manuscripts
Until 2008, it was believed that there was just a single manuscript surviving from that time. Kept in the British Library, it is lavishly illustrated, and believed to be the copy sent to Queen Emma or a close reproduction of that copy. One leaf has been lost from the manuscript in modern times, but its text survives in late paper copies.

Then a new manuscript, the Courtenay Compendium, was found in the papers of the 18th Earl of Devon at the Devon Record Office. This version, however, is believed to have been compiled in 1043, around two years after the other surviving text. It adds detail to the content, showing the rise and succession of Edward the Confessor in a very positive light. The first manuscript offers him just a fleeting mention.

The new manuscript has been acquired by the Royal Library of Denmark.

Date and provenance
It is usually thought that the text was written in 1041 or 1042, in response to a politically delicate situation, which had arisen recently at the English court. Harthacnut (reigned 1040–42), Emma's son by Cnut the Great, was king of England, and Edward the Confessor, her son by Æthelred, had been invited back from exile in Normandy and sworn in as Harthacnut's successor. The concurrent presence of a king and another claimant to the throne was a recipe for unrest, especially considering that Edward's brother, Ælfred (died 1036), had earlier been betrayed (as rumour had it, at the instigation of Earl Godwine).

As the portrait above emphasises, the work appears to have been directed specifically at Harthacnut and Edward, instilling a message about their past and future. As such, the Encomium is a heavily biased and selective work. Commissioned by Queen Emma herself, it strives to show her and Cnut in as favourable a light as possible. Thus, it silently glosses over Emma's first marriage to Æthelred, contests whether Harold Harefoot, Cnut's son by his first wife Ælfgifu, was indeed a son of Cnut, and places the blame for Ælfred's murder squarely on Harold.

Despite its shortcomings, the Encomium is an important primary source for early 11th-century English and Scandinavian history.

Authorship
The anonymous author, often simply referred to as "The Encomiast", was probably a Flemish monk, as he identifies himself in the text as a monk of St Bertin's or St Omer's. He mentions that he wrote the work at the specific request of his patroness Emma, to whom he shows some gratitude, and that he had witnessed Cnut when the king visited the abbey on his journey homeward.

Form and content
The form and style of the text show much indebtedness to classical authors. Virgil and his Aeneid are explicitly cited in the prefatory letter and in Book I, Chapter 4, while influences from Sallust, Lucan, Ovid, Horace, Juvenal and Lucretius have also been detected.

The Encomium divides into three books. The first deals with Sweyn Forkbeard, King of Denmark, and his conquest of England. The second deals with his son, Cnut the Great, his reconquest of England, his marriage to Emma and his period of rule. The third book deals with events after Cnut's death: Emma's troubles during the reign of Harold Harefoot, and the accession of her sons, Harthacnut and Edward the Confessor, to the throne.

According to the medievalist Eleanor Parker, "The Encomium reveals an active and forceful woman participating in the writing of history, reshaping the story of her own life in a way that suited her interests."

Footnotes

References
Alistair Campbell, editor and translator, 1949: Encomium Emmae Reginae. Camden 3rd series No. 72. London: Royal Historical Society
Alistair Campbell, editor and translator, and Simon Keynes, supplementary introduction, 1998,: Encomium Emmae Reginae. Cambridge University Press

Further reading

External links
Encomium Emmae Reginae Overview by Stephen J. Murray
Encomium Emmae reginae Georg Heinrich Pertz's 1865 edition

11th-century history books
11th-century Latin books